Ian Braque Gomez (born December 27, 1964) is an American actor known for his comedic TV work, which include series-regular roles as Javier on Felicity and Andy on Cougar Town.

Early life
He was born in New York City, New York, to an artist father and a dancer mother.

Career
On The Drew Carey Show from 1995 to 2004, Gomez played Larry Almada, a co-worker of Drew Carey's character (also named Drew Carey) at Winfred-Louder. He also worked with Carey in 1999 on the show Whose Line is it Anyway? From 1998 to 2002, he played Javier Clemente Quintata on the WB show Felicity.

In 2002, Gomez starred in Alanis Morissette's "Hands Clean" music video. In the same year, he appeared with Jeff Garlin, Ted Danson, Michael York, and Hugh Mellon in two episodes of the HBO series Curb Your Enthusiasm, where he played the "bald chef", hired by Larry to cook in the restaurant he owned.

Gomez appeared in ABC's Jake in Progress (2005–2006), which starred John Stamos. 2006 saw Gomez appear in the fourth episode of Losts third season, "Every Man for Himself", and as a therapist in the April 2006 episode "Here We Go Again" of Reba.

Gomez took the part of Andy Torres in the ABC and later TBS comedy Cougar Town alongside fellow The Drew Carey Show castmate Christa Miller, from 2009 to 2015. In 2016, Gomez and his then-wife, Nia Vardalos, co-presented The Great American Baking Show, a revival of The Great Holiday Baking Show.

In 2019, he appeared in the Clint Eastwood film Richard Jewell.

In 2020, Gomez was cast in the role of Luis Flores in the NBC comedy pilot Night School based on the 2018 film and written by Christopher Moynihan. However, NBC ultimately decided not to move forward with the series.

Personal life
He was married to actress-writer Nia Vardalos of My Big Fat Greek Wedding fame. He appeared in her films My Big Fat Greek Wedding, Connie and Carla, My Life in Ruins, I Hate Valentine's Day, and My Big Fat Greek Wedding 2. Gomez is of Puerto Rican and Russian Jewish descent, and converted to Greek Orthodoxy upon marrying Vardalos, which is mirrored as a plot element in My Big Fat Greek Wedding. In 2008, the two adopted a daughter. It was announced on July 3, 2018 that Vardalos filed for divorce from Gomez after 23 years of marriage due to irreconcilable differences. The divorce was finalized in December 2018.

Filmography

Film

Television

References

External links

1964 births
Greek Orthodox Christians from the United States
American male film actors
American male television actors
20th-century American male actors
21st-century American male actors
Hispanic and Latino American male actors
Jewish American male actors
Converts to Eastern Orthodoxy
Living people
Male actors from New York City
American people of Puerto Rican descent
American people of Russian-Jewish descent
Converts to Christianity from Judaism
Converts to Eastern Orthodoxy from Judaism